The 2007 NORCECA Beach Volleyball Circuit at Puerto Rico was held May 18–20, 2007 in Carolina, Puerto Rico. It was the third leg of the NORCECA Beach Volleyball Circuit 2007.

Women's competition

Men's competition

References
 NORCECA
 BV Database (Archived 2009-05-16)
 PR Volleyball Fed (Archived 2009-05-16)

Puerto Rico
Norceca Beach Volleyball Circuit (Puerto Rico), 2007
International volleyball competitions hosted by Puerto Rico